The Poire à la Beaujolaise or pear in wine is a traditional dessert of the wine-growing region of Beaujolais, and belonging to the cuisine of Burgundy and Lyon.

History 
In the early 19th century, a recipe already existed, known as "old wife pear compote". The pears were cooked in a pan with red wine, sugar, a piece of cinnamon and cloves. Once cooked, the pears would develop wrinkles, thus the name "old wife". If the cooking did not result in the desired red color, cochineal was added and a tin spoon placed inside the jar. Gaston Bachelard in his book Rational materialism said, "Tin has the property on enhancing the red color of vegetable matter; this fact is known by cooks, who never fail to put a tin spoon in pear compote, in order to give it a good red color".

Preparation 
To prepare the pears with red wine, a fruity wine (in this case, Beaujolais) should be used. The other ingredients are sugar or honey, cloves, peppercorn, a cinnamon stick, a vanilla pod and orange zest. The mixture is brought to the boil and drained, thus allowing the wine to be reduced. The dessert is served cold or lukewarm.

References

French desserts
Pear dishes
Wine dishes
Culture of Burgundy